The Madagascar pratincole (Glareola ocularis) is a species of bird in the family Glareolidae.
It is found in Comoros, Ethiopia, Kenya, Madagascar, Mozambique, Somalia, Tanzania, possibly Mauritius, and possibly Réunion.
Its natural habitats are subtropical or tropical seasonally wet or flooded lowland grassland, rivers, freshwater lakes, rocky shores, and intertidal marshes.
It is threatened by habitat loss.

References

External links
BirdLife Species Factsheet.

Madagascar pratincole
Birds of Madagascar
Madagascar pratincole
Taxonomy articles created by Polbot
Taxa named by Jules Verreaux